University of Birmingham Boat Club is a rowing club on the River Severn, based at The Towpath, New Road, Worcester, Worcestershire. A second boathouse is also used for the development squad which is shared with Birmingham Rowing Club.

History
The club was founded in 1949 and belongs to the University of Birmingham. The senior squad row out the Worcester boathouse while the development squad row out of the Birmingham Rowing Club boathouse on Edgbaston Reservoir.

The club produced national champions in 1986 and 2009.

Honours

National champions

References

Sport at the University of Birmingham
Sport in Worcestershire
Sport in Worcester, England
Rowing clubs in England
Rowing clubs of the River Severn